National Philanthropy Day is an annual observance on November 15 that is designated by the Association of Fundraising Professionals (AFP) to celebrate charitable activities in the form of donated financial, in-kind, and volunteering support.

It is celebrated with blog postings by AFP that highlight outstanding charitable activities, as well as luncheons and awards throughout the United States, as well as other places in North and South America, by different AFP chapters.

History
The Association of Fundraising Professionals' (AFP) National Philanthropy Day was created in 1986 by philanthropist Douglas Freeman of Orange County, California, and formalized by then-U.S. President Ronald Reagan, who signed a proclamation recognizing November 15 as National Philanthropy Day in the US.

In 2012, the Government of Canada signed the National Philanthropy Day Act into law, declaring November 15 as the annual celebration of National Philanthropy Day as well.

Overview 
National Philanthropy Day is registered with the United States Patent and Trademark Office and the U.S. Department of Commerce. The official National Philanthropy Day song, "Now More Than Eve,," was written by Marvin Hamlisch. The day has been celebrated by AFP chapters across the US, including San Diego, California, Toledo, Ohio, Chattanooga, Tennessee, and Detroit, Michigan.

See also

 Association for Leaders in Volunteer Engagement
 Association for Volunteer Administration
 Global Youth Service Day
 Good Deeds Day
 International Council of Voluntary Agencies
 International Volunteer Day
 International Year of Volunteers
 Join Hands Day
 List of awards for volunteerism and community service
 Make A Difference Day
 Mandela Day
 MLK Day of service
 Mitzvah Day
 National Public Lands Day (USA)
 NetDay
 Random Acts of Kindness Day
 September 11 National Day of Service (9/11 Day)
 Sewa Day
 World Kindness Day

References

External links
Official Website

November observances
Philanthropy
Observances in the United States
Observances in Canada
Philanthropy in the United States
Philanthropy in Canada